Lafayette Township, Ohio, may refer to:

Lafayette Township, Coshocton County, Ohio
Lafayette Township, Medina County, Ohio

Ohio township disambiguation pages